Sand Screens is a 1991 film that is Lebanese director Randa Chahal Sabag's first feature film.

References

1991 drama films
1991 films
French drama films
Italian drama films
Tunisian drama films
Films directed by Randa Chahal Sabag
1990s French films